ʻAbd al-Awwal (ALA-LC romanization of ) is a Muslim male given name and, in modern usage, surname. It is built from the Arabic words ʻabd and al-Awwal, one of the names of God in the Qur'an, which give rise to the Muslim theophoric names. It means "servant of the First".

Males

Given name
Abdul Awal (Pakistani politician), Pakistani-Bengali politician
Abdul Awal Bhuiya, Pakistani parliamentary secretary for Foreign Affairs
Abdul Awwal Jaunpuri (1867–1921), Indian Islamic scholar and author
Abdul Awal Khan, Bengali politician from Rangpur
Abdul Awal Mia, Bangladeshi politician
Abdul Awal Mintoo (born 1949), Bangladeshi businessman
Abdul Awal Sarkar (died 1999), Bangladeshi freedom fighter

See also
Auwal H Yadudu, Nigerian academic
Auwal Mosque in Cape Town, South Africa
Awal Ashaari, Malaysian actor
Awaludin, Indonesian actor
Awaludin Said, Malaysian politician
Awwal Ibrahim, former Governor of Niger
Awwal Zubairu Gambo, Chief of Naval Staff in Nigeria

References

Arabic masculine given names
Bangladeshi masculine given names